Arthur Cruz (born May 27, 1988) is an American musician, best known as the drummer of heavy metal band Lamb of God. He is the former drummer of Winds of Plague, Prong and Klogr.

Early life

Cruz was born May 27, 1988, in Downey, California. He grew up in the suburb city of South El Monte located east of Los Angeles in the San Gabriel Valley. While attending South El Monte High School, Cruz joined the marching band percussion section and performed from 2004–2006.

Music career

Winds of Plague
In 2008, Cruz was asked to join Winds of Plague and recorded the album The Great Stone War. The album peaked at No. 72 on the Billboard 200. In 2011 he performed on the band's next album, Against the World, which peaked at No. 60 on the Billboard 200. In 2012, Cruz left Winds of Plague citing "creative differences". Cruz returned as their drummer in 2015, and would also perform on the album Blood of My Enemy in 2017. In 2021, he left Winds of Plague in order to focus on Lamb of God, which he joined in 2018.

Prong
Following his departure from Winds of Plague, Cruz was asked to play for Prong. Cruz has toured and recorded on their album Songs from the Black Hole. Cruz left Prong in 2018.

Klogr and The Rasmus
In 2017, Cruz collaborated on drums on alternative metal project Klogr for the single Technocracy and a European Tour with The Rasmus.

Lamb of God
In 2018, Cruz filled in for Chris Adler on Lamb of God's North American tour, which also included supporting Slayer on their farewell tour.

In 2019, he officially became the drummer for Lamb of God following Chris Adler's departure from the band.

Cruz's first release with Lamb of God was their 2020 self-titled album.

Equipment

Cruz endorses Meinl cymbals, and he uses Ludwig drums, Evans drumheads, Axis pedals, and Vic Firth drumsticks.

Personal life

Cruz is an avid baseball fan and is known to be a die hard Los Angeles Dodgers fan. With this, Cruz Founded and owns the Lifestyle Baseball Apparel brand, BASELORDS. In addition, Cruz is an amateur Illusionist and is said to perform sleight of hand or micromagic.

Discography
Lamb of God
 Lamb of God (2020)
 Omens (2022)

Winds of Plague 
 The Great Stone War (2009)
 Against the World (2011)
 Blood of My Enemy (2017)

Prong
 Songs from the Black Hole (2015)
 X – No Absolutes (2016)
 Zero Days (2017)

References

1988 births
21st-century American drummers
American heavy metal musicians
American heavy metal drummers
American musicians of Mexican descent
Hispanic and Latino American musicians
Lamb of God (band) members
Living people
Musicians from Los Angeles County, California
People from Downey, California
Prong (band) members